Tity Dumbuya (born 21 February 2003) is a Sierra Leonean swimmer. She competed in the women's 50 metre freestyle at the 2020 Summer Olympics.

References

External links
 

2003 births
Living people
Sierra Leonean female swimmers
Olympic swimmers of Sierra Leone
Swimmers at the 2020 Summer Olympics
Place of birth missing (living people)
Swimmers at the 2022 Commonwealth Games
Commonwealth Games competitors for Sierra Leone
21st-century Sierra Leonean people